Keokuk (YTB-771) is a United States Navy  named for Keokuk, Iowa, and the third navy ship to carry the name.

Construction

The contract for Keokuk was awarded 18 January 1963. She was laid down on 5 December 1963 at Mobile, Alabama, by Mobile Ship Repair and launched 21 May 1964. Placed in service 4 September 1964, Chief Boatswain's Mate Jerry R. Richter in command.

Operational history

Keokuk served in the Norfolk, Virginia, area as a tug and is currently in active service at the Portsmouth Naval Shipyard.

References

External links
 

 

Natick-class large harbor tugs
Ships built in Mobile, Alabama
1964 ships